The Dunedin Northern Cemetery is a major historic cemetery in the southern New Zealand city of Dunedin. It is located on a sloping site close to Lovelock Avenue on a spur of Signal Hill close to the Dunedin Botanic Gardens and the suburb of Opoho, overlooking Dunedin North and Logan Park. The  site was set aside in 1872, with the last plot being purchased in 1937. The cemetery forms part of Dunedin's Town belt, a green belt surrounding the inner city. Unlike many cemeteries of its age, Dunedin Northern Cemetery is not divided by denomination, and with its landscapes and wooded slopes remains an important part of the city's Victorian landscape.

The cemetery contains many notable graves and tombs, most prominently the mausoleum of William Larnach, designed by R.A. Lawson as a miniature replica of First Church. Other notable burials and interments include Thomas Bracken and Vincent Pyke.

There are war graves of 17 Commonwealth service personnel from World War I and 3 from World War II.

The sexton's cottage at the entrance to the cemetery contains a visitor's centre. A commemorative lookout, the Bracken Lookout, is located at the southern end of the cemetery, and commands views across Logan Park, the University of Otago and central city.

The cemetery is listed on the New Zealand Historic Places Trust Register as a Historic Place – Category I.

Notable interments

 Thomas Bracken
 Alfred Henry Burton
 Thomas Hocken
 W. M. Hodgkins
 William Larnach
 Robert Lawson
 William Mason
 George O'Brien
 Ada Paterson
 Alfred Hamish Reed

References

External links
 Cemetery website
 

Northern Cemetery
Heritage New Zealand Category 1 historic places in Otago
Burials at Dunedin Northern Cemetery